Albright College is a private liberal arts college in Reading, Pennsylvania. It was founded in 1856.

History
Albright College traces its founding to 1856 when Union Seminary opened. Present-day Albright was formed by the mergers of several institutions: Albright Collegiate Institute, Central Pennsylvania College, and Schuylkill College.

Albright Collegiate Institute opened in 1895 and was renamed Albright College three years later. Union Seminary, meanwhile, became Central Pennsylvania College in 1887 and merged with Albright College in 1902. Schuylkill Seminary, the third institution, was founded in 1881, became Schuylkill College in 1923, and merged into Albright in 1928.

Albright's campus relocated from Myerstown, to Schuylkill College's campus, which is the present location of Albright, at the base of Mount Penn in Reading.

The college is named for Pennsylvania-German evangelical preacher Jacob Albright, who founded the Evangelical Association (later known as the Evangelical United Brethren Church). Born in 1759 in Douglass Township, (now Montgomery County) with the given name of Johannes Jacob Albrecht, the family changed their surname to "Albright" following Jacob's 1808 death.

Academics
Albright College students are encouraged to cross and combine areas of study without taking longer to graduate. The college offers Bachelor of Arts and Bachelor of Science degrees, as well as a Master of Arts and Master of Science degrees in education. The college also offers online and accelerated degree programs.

Albright offers a wide range of classical and pre-professional programs. It created one of the first undergraduate psychobiology programs in the nation in the 1960s. The college's liberal arts curriculum has a cross-program focus that allows students to create an individualized education. Fully half of Albright students have concentrations that combine two or three fields of learning.

The theatre program has been honored by the Kennedy Center American College Theater Festival consistently for many years. Albright's Domino Players Company has been invited to perform at the Region II KCACTF Festival 10 times in the last 18 years (2004, 2007, 2009, 2011, 2013, 2014, 2015, 2016, 2019 and 2020). At the National Conference held every April in Washington DC, Albright's theatre program has garnered dozens of awards for distinguished work in performance, direction, dramaturgy, scenic, sound, costume, and lighting design. Acclaimed productions of “Waiting for Godot” (2007), “Clybourne Park” (2016), “A Raisin in the Sun” (2018) have also been named “Outstanding Production of a Play” – recognizing them as the best college production of their years. “A Raisin in the Sun” also received eight other national awards, for distinguished performance, scenic and lighting design, director and performances. Graduates of the program have gone on to graduate study at such schools as Yale, NYU, Brown, Columbia, Villanova, UArts/Pig Iron, SCAD, UMass Amherst, University of Minnesota, and CalArts, and have distinguished themselves with work on Broadway, in Hollywood, and in theatres and opera houses across the globe.

The Albright Creative Research Experience (ACRE) is a multi-disciplinary program that affords undergraduate students the opportunity to conduct research or pursue creative endeavors during the three-week January Interim or summer break. The students, who work one-on-one with faculty members, can be from any discipline, from STEM subjects to the humanities.

Rankings
In 2017, Albright College was named one of the "Best Northeastern" schools by The Princeton Review; this was the fourteenth consecutive year that the college was included in that category. In the "Campus Ethnic Diversity" category, as part of the U.S. News & World Report 2018 Best Colleges rankings, U.S. News ranked Albright 33rd out of 208 national liberal arts colleges. In the "Economic Diversity" category, Albright ranked 27th out of 210 national liberal arts schools named. The Economist magazine listed Albright among the top 50 American colleges and universities for economic value in 2015.

Athletics
Albright College athletic teams compete in the National Collegiate Athletic Association (NCAA) Division III as a member of the Middle Atlantic Conferences.

Charles "Pop" Kelchner founded the men's basketball team in 1900 and was athletic director at Albright College for 21 years. He was involved in aspects of Major League Baseball for over 50 years. Albright College dedicated the baseball field as Kelchner Field in 1952. Branch Rickey gave the dedication speech, with Connie Mack in attendance. Kelchner was a graduate of Lafayette College with two degrees and was proficient in German, French, Italian, Spanish, Classical Latin and Greek. He served as Professor of Languages and athletic director.

Doggie Julian was the head football coach at Albright from 1929 to 1930. Clarence Lester "Biggie" Munn was the head football coach at Albright College from 1935 to 1936, before coaching Syracuse University (1946), and most notably Michigan State College (1947–1953), where his 1952 squad won a national championship.

William "Lone Star" Dietz was the Director of Athletics and head football coach at Albright from 1937 to 1942. Dietz led the football team to their first undefeated season in 1937.  He previously led Washington State to 1916 Rose Bowl victory. In the National Football League, Dietz had coached the Boston "Redskins" (1933–1934), the forerunner of the Washington Commanders. Dietz is in the Albright College Athletic Hall of Fame and the College Football Hall of Fame.

In 1948, the University of Maryland Eastern Shore (UMES) and Albright College played the first intercollegiate football game between an Historically Black Colleges and Universities (HBCU) institution and a majority-white institution.

The Philadelphia Eagles held pre-season training camp at Albright from 1968 through 1972.

Dr. Wilbur G. Renken was athletic director and basketball head coach for 38 consecutive seasons. A highly regarded figure in collegiate athletics in general and specifically basketball, Renken was the president of the United States Olympic Basketball Team Selection Committee for the 1976 Olympic Games. He also served as the president of the National Association of Basketball Coaches (NABC) in 1979–1980.

On October 11, 2017, sophomore backup quarterback Gyree Durante was dismissed from the football team for kneeling during the national anthem before the team's game against Delaware Valley University, going against a collective team decision made before the game to kneel for the coin toss and stand for the anthem. President Fetrow later offered reinstatement to the team to Durante (and two other players who did not fully kneel during the coin toss), saying that further review of the details surrounding the game's events found that "what we understood to be shared agreement among players, student leaders and coaches has not been adequately supported.”. Durante, however, declined reinstatement, citing his former teammates' stated lack of trust in him.

WXAC
Albright's campus radio station, WXAC 91.3 FM is a student-operated college radio station. The initial call name was WALC, but was later changed to WXAC on March 8, 1965. WALC had been the same call name for the Alcoa Steamship Lines.

Notable alumni
 Eric Artz '89, President and CEO of Recreational Equipment, Inc. (REI)
 Haps Benfer '14, college football, basketball, and baseball head coach
 Will Bond '82, actor, founding member of SITI Company
 Joseph E. Coleman '48, politician, attorney and chemist; first African-American elected president of Philadelphia City Council
 Leo Disend '38, played tackle with the Green Bay Packers and the Brooklyn Dodgers football team
 Saidah Arrika Ekulona '92, Obie Award-winning Film/TV/Stage actress, Ruined, Bob Hearts Abishola
 Edwin Erickson '60, State Senator, Pennsylvania
 Craig Fass '96, chef, and creator with Mike Ginelli '95 and Brian Turtle '95, of the game Six Degrees of Kevin Bacon, which inspired Kevin Bacon to create the charitable organization, SixDegrees.org 
 R. Scott French '87, American Fashion Designer, CFDA
 Jacquelyn S. Fetrow '82, PhD, computational biologist and current president of Albright College, former Provost and Professor of Chemistry at the University of Richmond
 John Fetterman '91, United States Senator, 2023-Present; 34th Lieutenant Governor of Pennsylvania, 2019–2023
 Doris Freedman '50, pioneer in the field of public art
 Robert Gerhart '41, Pennsylvania State Senator for the 11th district from 1969 to 1972
 Robert P. Hollenbeck (born 1931), politician who served six terms in the New Jersey General Assembly from the 36th Legislative District.
 Ralph I. Horwitz, MD '69, Director of the Institute for Transformative Medicine at Temple University, Harold H. Hines, Jr. Professor Emeritus of Medicine and Epidemiology at Yale University
 Brent Hurley '01, investor, consultant, and member of the founding team at YouTube
 Dr. Glenn S. Kaplan '73, Neonatologist at Children's Hospital of Philadelphia (2018-Present), Chief of Neonatology at Nemours (2000-2018)
 Thomas R. Kline, Esq. '69, leading trial lawyer
 Casey Lawrence '10, professional baseball pitcher for the Toronto Blue Jays of Major League Baseball
 Jeffrey Lentz '85, Grammy-nominated opera singer and director
 Mũkoma wa Ngũgĩ '94, Kenyan poet and author, Associate Professor of English and Africana Studies at Cornell University
 Hidy Ochiai '66, author and actor, introduced the Washin-Ryu style of karate in the United States
 Anthony Portantino ’83, State Senator, California
 Nathan Roberts '00, Helen Hayes Award-nominated Sound Designer, The Widow Lincoln
 Paul Sinclair '97, GM and Executive VP, Atlantic Records
 Danene Sorace '94, Mayor of Lancaster, Pennsylvania, former director of Answer program at Rutgers University.
 Bob Spitz '71, celebrity biographer
 Kristofer Updike '99, VP of Kids Development, Entertainment Scripted & Unscripted Content, NBCUniversal
 Matthew Urbanski '85, landscape architect
 Russell Weigley '52, Distinguished University Professor of History at Temple University
 Victor Yarnell '51, 41st Mayor of Reading, Pennsylvania

References

External links

 
 Albright College Athletics website

 
Universities and colleges affiliated with the United Methodist Church
Eastern Pennsylvania Rugby Union
Educational institutions established in 1856
Buildings and structures in Reading, Pennsylvania
Universities and colleges in Berks County, Pennsylvania
Liberal arts colleges in Pennsylvania
Private universities and colleges in Pennsylvania
1856 establishments in Pennsylvania